The Grey Album: On the Blackness of Blackness is a 2012 book of literary and cultural criticism by Kevin Young. It was a finalist for the National Book Critics Circle Award in Criticism.

The book centers the figures the trickster in African-American (and thus, American) literary history from Phillis Wheatley through Jay-Z. Young argues that the act of lying—the counterfeit—forms an essential genre of self-making in the African-American literary and musical tradition. He rejects white critics’ preoccupation with “authenticity”, saying such criticism fails even before it begins to engage the work, by foreclosing the possibilities deceit opened in African-American stories.

References

American essay collections
Graywolf Press books
2012 non-fiction books